The Cornwall League 2 2008–09 was a full season of rugby union within Cornwall League 2. This was the last time Cornwall League 2 ran until the 2011-12 season, due to restructuring.

Team Changes
The number of teams in the Cornwall/Devon League increased from 12 teams to 16 for the following 2009-10 season, therefore the two Cornwall Leagues combined to form a single division of 12 teams, in Cornwall League 1.

Table

Points were awarded as follows:
 2 points for a win
 1 point for a draw
 0 points for a loss

References

See also

 Trelawney's Army Cornwall rugby website

Cornwall
Cornwall League 2